The Men's 10,000 metres event at the 2011 Asian Athletics Championships took place on July 7, 2011, at the Kobe Universiade Memorial Stadium.

Medalists

Records

Results

Final
The race was held at 20:10 local time.

References

10,000 metres
10,000 metres at the Asian Athletics Championships